Beipiao is a city in Chaoyang prefecture, Liaoning province, in Northeast China. It has a population of 202,807. The main industry in the area is coal mining. With vertical shafts of almost 1000m, these are some of the deepest coal mines in China. The coal produced is used for coking. Daheishan National Forest Park is located in the northwestern part of Beipiao city.

The dinosaur Beipiaosaurus was named after the city where its fossils were found nearby.

Administrative Divisions
There are 7 subdistricts, 7 towns, 17 townships, and 2 ethnic townships under the administration of the city.

Subdistricts:
Nanshan Subdistrict, Taiji Subdistrict, Sanbao Subdistrict, Qiaobei Subdistrict, Chengguan Subdistrict, Guanshan Subdistrict, Dongtaiji Subdistrict

Towns:
Baoguolao, Heichengzi, Xiguanying, Shangyuan, Wujianfang, Daban, Taohuatu

Townships:
Dongguanying Township, Sanbao Township, Quanjuyong Township, Sanbaoying Township, Beitazi Township, Taijiying Township, Loujiadian Township, Beisijia Township, Changheying Township, Xiaotazi Township, Dasanjiazi Township, Mengguying Township, Longtan Township, Changgao Township, Batuying Township, Ha'ernao Township, Zhangguying Township, Liangshuihe Mongol Ethnic Township, Mayouying Manchu Ethnic Township

Climate

See also

References

External links

 
Cities in Liaoning
Chaoyang, Liaoning